The Air Force Weapon Systems Command (GAFWSC) was a German Air Force command authority of the division level, with the responsibility for air force logistics, armament, and in-service support controlling of the GAF material and airborne vehicles.

See also
 Military organization

References

External links
 Air Force Weapon Systems Command on the German Air Force website

Air force commands of Germany
Military units and formations established in 2006
Military units and formations disestablished in 2013
Units and formations of the German Air Force